The 1970 World Figure Skating Championships were held at the Hala Tivoli in Ljubljana, SR Slovenia, SFR Yugoslavia from March 3 to 8. At the event, sanctioned by the International Skating Union, medals were awarded in men's singles, ladies' singles, pair skating, and ice dance.

The ISU Representative was John R. Shoemaker of the United States.

Medal table

Results

Men

Referee:
 Elemér Terták 

Assistant Referee:
 Sonia Bianchetti 

Judges:
 Mabel Graham 
 Milan Duchón 
 Jeanine Donnier-Blanc 
 Audrey Williams 
 Helga von Wiecki 
 Tatiana Danilenko 
 Mollie Phillips 
 Franz Wojtanowskyj 
 Márta Léces 

Substitute judge:
 Hans Fuchs

Ladies

Referee:
 Major Elemér Terták 

Assistant Referee:
 Sonia Bianchetti 

Judges:
 Franz Heinlein 
 Yvonne S. McGowan 
 Walburga Grimm 
 Ferenc Kertész 
 Ralph S. McCreath 
 Pamela Davis 
 Wilhelm Kahle 
 Nonna Nestegina 
 René Schlageter 

Substitute judge:
 Giorgio Siniscalco

Pairs

Referee:
 Karl Enderlin 

Assistant Referee:
 Walter Malek 

Judges:
 Nonna Nestegina 
 Yvonne S. McGowan 
 Hans Fuchs 
 Carla Listing 
 Ralph S. McCreath 
 Liliane Caffin-Madaule 
 Ludwig Gassner 
 Maria Zuchowicz 
 Kikuko Minami 

Substitute judge:
 Milan Duchón

Ice dance

Referee:
 Lawrence Demmy 

Assistant Referee:
 Emil Skákala 

Judges:
 Mollie Phillips 
 Mabel Graham 
 Igor Kabanov 
 Eugen Romminger 
 Carla Listing 
 Miroslav Hansenöhrl 
 George J. Blundun 
 Jacqueline Meudec 
 Henrik Hajós 

Substitute judge:
 Maria Zuchowicz

Sources
 Result list provided by the ISU

World Figure Skating Championships
World Figure Skating Championships
Sports competitions in Ljubljana
World Figure Skating Championships, 1970
International figure skating competitions hosted by Yugoslavia
March 1970 sports events in Europe
1970 in Slovenia
1970s in Ljubljana